The 2020–21 season was Ajax's 121st season in existence and the club's 65th consecutive season in the Eredivisie. In addition to the domestic league, Ajax participated in this season's edition of the KNVB Cup, the UEFA Champions League and the UEFA Europa League.

Squad

Transfers
For a list of all Dutch football transfers in the summer window (1 July 2020 to 31 August 2020) please see List of Dutch football transfers summer 2020. For a list of all Dutch football transfers in the winter window (1 January 2021 to 1 February 2021) please see List of Dutch football transfers winter 2020–21.

Transfers in

Transfers out

Loans in

Loans out

Transfer summary
Undisclosed fees are not included in the transfer totals.

Expenditure

Summer:  €42,750,000

Winter:  €22,500,000

Total:  €65,250,000

Income

Summer:  €109,230,000

Winter:  €8,500,000

Total:  €117,730,000

Net totals

Summer:  €66,480,000

Winter:  €14,000,000

Total:  €52,480,000

Pre-season and friendlies

Competitions

Overview

Eredivisie

League table

Results summary

Results by round

Matches

KNVB Cup

UEFA Champions League

Group stage

The group stage draw was held on 1 October 2020.

UEFA Europa League

Knockout phase

Round of 32
The round of 32 draw was held on 14 December 2020.

Round of 16
The round of 16 draw was held on 26 February 2021.

Quarter-finals
The draw for the quarter-finals was held on 19 March 2021.

Statistics

Appearances and goals

|-
|colspan="14"|Players sold or loaned out after the start of the season:

|-

Goalscorers

Clean sheets

Disciplinary record

References

External links

AFC Ajax seasons
Ajax
Ajax
Dutch football championship-winning seasons